Selce pri Moravčah is a small settlement in the Municipality of Moravče in central Slovenia. The area is part of the traditional region of Upper Carniola. It is now included with the rest of the Municipality of Moravče in the Central Slovenia Statistical Region.

Name
The name of the settlement was changed from Selce to Selce pri Moravčah in 1955.

References

External links

Selce pri Moravčah on Geopedia

Populated places in the Municipality of Moravče